Marina Jaunâtre (born 20 May 1982) is a road cyclist from France. She represented her nation at the 2004, 2005, 2006 and 2007 UCI Road World Championships. A bad fall in July 2009 ended her career as a cyclist, but continued to be involved in amateur championships as a coach and trainer. She gave birth to her first child in January 2011.

References

External links
 profile at Procyclingstats.com

1982 births
French female cyclists
Living people
Place of birth missing (living people)
People from Meaux
Sportspeople from Seine-et-Marne
Cyclists from Île-de-France